John 1:18 is the eighteenth verse in the first chapter of the Gospel of John in the New Testament of the Christian Bible.

Content
In the original Greek according to Westcott-Hort this verse is:
Θεὸν οὐδεὶς ἑώρακε πώποτε· ὁ μονογενὴς θεὸς, ὁ ὢν εἰς τὸν κόλπον τοῦ πατρός, ἐκεῖνος ἐξηγήσατο.

In the King James Version of the Bible the text reads:
No man hath seen God at any time; the only begotten Son, which is in the bosom of the Father, he hath declared him.

The New International Version translates the passage as:
No one has ever seen God, but God the One and Only, who is at the Father's side, has made him known.

Analysis
By the verse "No man hath seen God," Witham believes it means that no mortal in this life has ever had a perfect union and enjoyment of God, and that no one can perfectly comprehend his infinite greatness, except the only-begotten divine Son who is with the Father. For as Christ said, "I am in the Father, and the Father in me."

This verse closes the prologue of the Gospel of John, which is also called "Hymn to the Word", as it recalls verse 1, that there is no other possibility for humans to know God except through Jesus Christ.

Commentary from the Church Fathers
Chrysostom: "Or thus; the Evangelist after showing the great superiority of Christ’s gifts, compared with those dispensed by Moses, wishes in the next place to supply an adequate reason for the difference. The one being a servant was made a minister of a lesser dispensation: but the other Who was Lord, and Son of the King, brought us far higher things, being ever coexistent with the Father, and beholding Him. Then follows, No man hath seen God at any time, &c."

Augustine: "What is that then which Jacob said, I have seen God face to face;  and that which is written of Moses, he talked with God face to face;  and that which the prophet Isaiah saith of himself, I saw the Lord sitting upon a throne? "

Gregory the Great: "It is plainly given us to understand here, that while we are in this mortal state, we can see God only through the medium of certain images, not in the reality of His own nature. A soul influenced by the grace of the Spirit may see God through certain figures, but cannot penetrate into his absolute essence. And hence it is that Jacob, who testifies that he saw God, saw nothing but an Angel: and that Moses, who talked with God face to face, says, Shew me Thy way, that I may know Thee: meaning that he ardently desired to see in the brightness of His own infinite Nature, Him Whom he had only as yet seen reflected in images."

Chrysostom: "If the old fathers had seen That very Nature, they would not have contemplated It so variously, for It is in Itself simple and without shape; It sits not, It walks not; these are the qualities of bodies. Whence he saith through the Prophet, I have multiplied visions, and used similitudes, by the ministry of the Prophets: i. e. I have condescended to them, I appeared that which I was not. For inasmuch as the Son of God was about to manifest Himself to us in actual flesh, men were at first raised to the sight of God, in such ways as allowed of their seeing Him."

Augustine: "Now it is said, Blessed are the pure in heart, for they shall see God; (Matthew 5:8) and again, When He shall appear, we shall be like unto Him, for we shall see Him as He is. What is the meaning then of the words here: No man hath seen God at any time? The reply is easy: those passages speak of God, as to be seen, not as already seen. They shall see God, it is said, not, they have seen Him: nor is it, we have seen Him, but, we shall see Him as He is. For, No man hath seen God at any time, neither in this life, nor yet in the Angelic, as He is; in the same way in which sensible things are perceived by the bodily vision."

Gregory the Great: "If however any, while inhabiting this corruptible flesh, can advance to such an immeasurable height of virtue, as to be able to discern by the contemplative vision, the eternal brightness of God, their case affects not what we say. For whoever seeth wisdom, that is, God, is dead wholly to this life, being no longer occupied by the love of it."

Augustine: "For unless any in some sense die to this life, either by leaving the body altogether, or by being so withdrawn and alienated from carnal perceptions, that he may well not know, as the Apostle says, whether he be in the body or out of the body, (2 Corinthians 12:2) he cannot be carried away, and borne aloft to that vision."

Gregory the Great: "Some hold that in the place of bliss, God is visible in His brightness, but not in His nature. This is to indulge in over much subtlety. For in that simple and unchangeable essence, no division can be made between the nature and the brightness."

Augustine: "If we say, that the text, No oned hath seen God at any time, (1 Timothy 6:16) applies only to men; so that, as the Apostle more plainly interprets it, Whom no man hath seen nor can see, no one is to be understood here to mean, no one of men: the question may be solved in a way not to contradict what our Lord says, Their Angels do always behold the face of My Father; so that we must believe that Angels see, what no one, i. e. of men, hath ever seen."

Gregory the Great: "Some however there are who conceive that not even the Angels see God."

Chrysostom: "That very existence which is God, neither Prophets, nor even Angels, nor yet Archangels, have seen. For enquire of the Angels; they say nothing concerning His Substance; but sing, Glory to God in the highest, and Peace on earth to men of good will. Nay, ask even Cherubim and Seraphim; thou wilt hear only in reply the mystic melody of devotion, and that heaven and earth are full of His glory. (Is. 6:3)"

Augustine: "Which indeed is true so far, that no bodily or even mental vision of man hath ever embraced the fulness of God; for it is one thing to see, another to embrace the whole of what thou seest. A thing is seen, if only the sight of it be caught; but we only see a thing fully, when we have no part of it unseen, when we see round its extreme limits."

Chrysostom: "In this complete sense only the Son and the Holy Ghost see the Father. For how can created nature see that which is uncreated? So then no man knoweth the Father as the Son knoweth Him: and hence what follows, The Only-Begotten Son, Who is in the bosom of the Father, He hath declared Him. That we might not be led by the identity of the name, to confound Him with the sons made so by grace, the article is annexed in the first place; and then, to put an end to all doubt, the name Only-Begotten is introduced."

Hilary of Poitiers: "The Truth of His Nature did not seem sufficiently explained by the name of Son, unless, in addition, its peculiar force as proper to Him were expressed, so signifying its distinctness from all beside. For in that, besides Son, he calleth Him also the Only-Begotten, he cut off altogether all suspicion of adoption, the Nature of the Only-Begotten guaranteeing the truth of the name."

Chrysostom: "He adds, Which is in the bosom of the Father. To dwell in the bosom is much more than simply to see. For he who sees simply, hath not the knowledge thoroughly of that which he sees; but he who dwells in the bosom, knoweth every thing. When you hear then that no one knoweth the Father save the Son, do not by any means suppose that he only knows the Father more than any other, and does not know Him fully. For the Evangelist sets forth His residing in the bosom of the Father on this very account: viz. to show us the intimate converse of the Only-Begotten, and His coeternity with the Father."

Augustine: "In the bosom of the Father, i. e. in the secret Presence1 of the Father: for God hath not the folde on the bosom, as we have; nor must be imagined to sit, as we do; nor is He bound with a girdle, so as to have a fold: but from the fact of our bosom being placed innermost, the secret Presence of the Father is called the bosom of the Father. He then who, in the secret Presence of the Father, knew the Father, the same hath declared what He saw."

Chrysostom: "But what hath He declared? That God is one. But this the rest of the Prophets and Moses proclaim: what else have we learnt from the Son Who was in the bosom of the Father? In the first place, that those very truths, which the others declared, were declared through the operation of the Only Begotten: in the next place, we have received a far greater doctrine from the Only Begotten; viz. that God is a Spirit, and those who worship Him must worship Him in spirit and in truth; and that God is the Father of the Only Begotten."

Bede: "Farther, if the word declared have reference to the past, it must be considered that He, being made man, declared the doctrine of the Trinity in unity, and how, and by what acts we should prepare ourselves for the contemplation of it. If it have reference to the future, then it means that He will declare Him, when He shall introduce His elect to the vision of His brightness."

Augustine: "Yet have there been men, who, deceived by the vanity of their hearts, maintained that the Father is invisible, the Son visible. Now if they call the Son visible, with respect to His connexion with the flesh, we object not; it is the Catholic doctrine. But it is madness in them to say He was so before His incarnation; i. e. if it be true that Christ is the Wisdom of God, and the Power of God. The Wisdom of God cannot be seen by the eye. If the human word cannot be seen by the eye, how can the Word of God?"

Chrysostom: "The text then, No man hath seen God at any time, applies not to the Father only, but also to the Son: for He, as Paul saith, is the Image of the invisible God; but He who is the Image of the Invisible, must Himself also be invisible."

References

Sources

External links
Other translations of John 1:18 at BibleHub

01:18